Suryakant Dhasmana (born 5 February 1964 in Dehradun) is an Indian politician. He is Vice President of Uttarakhand Pradesh Congress. His was educated at St. Joseph Academy, Dehradun. He graduated from DBS College, Dehradun with post graduation from DAV (PG) College, Dehradun.

Dhasmana was a candidate of Indian National Congress from Dehradun Cantonment Constituency in the 2017 Uttarakhand Legislative Assembly election. He was the chairman of Vinod Bharatwal Committee which led the plan of making of the state of Uttarakhand, and his recommendations played important role in formation of Uttarakhand.

Electoral Performances

See also
 Charanjeet Kaushal

References

 SURYA KANT DHASMANA(Nationalist Congress Party(NCP)):Constituency- Lansdowne (Pauri Garhwal ) - Affidavit Information of Candidate:
 Suryakant Dhasmana- Latest News on Suryakant Dhasmana | Read Breaking News on Zee News
 News, Breaking News, Latest News, News Headlines, Live News, Today News CNN
 Dhasmana is State Policy and Planning Group chairman
 उत्तराखंड: कांग्रेस उपाध्यक्ष को CBI कोर्ट में पेश होने के आदेश
 Vuabai9 - game nổ hũ, quay hũ uy tín nhất 2022 - VB9
 
 
 The Tribune, Chandigarh, India - Dehradun Plus
 The Tribune, Chandigarh, India - Dehradun Plus

External links 

 

1964 births
Living people
20th-century Indian politicians
Indian National Congress politicians from Uttarakhand
Nationalist Congress Party politicians
Lok Dal politicians
Samajwadi Party politicians